Special Purpose Marine Air-Ground Task Force – Crisis Response – Central Command (SP-MAGTF-CR-CC) is a Marine Air-Ground Task Force that is based at an undisclosed location in Southwest Asia.

It is a self-mobile, self-sustaining force of Marines and sailors, capable of responding to a range of crises. The unit is specifically trained to support U.S. and partner interests throughout the United States Central Command area of responsibility, to include embassy reinforcement, support to noncombatant evacuation operations, tactical recovery of aircraft and personnel, humanitarian assistance, and disaster relief. The unit also takes part in bilateral and multilateral training exercises with regional partners. It is commanded by a U.S. Marine colonel (O-6).

History

 15.2 
 Ground Combat Element Established new US presence at al-Taqaddum, a previously-occupied joint base located in close proximity to ISIS holdings in Anbar province. This was discussed in American society as a sign of going back down the path to US combat "boots on the ground" in Iraq once again. 
 Supported Task Force "Al-Asad" in order to built partner capacity, train, and assist the Joint Task Force and Iraqi forces in their fight against the Islamic State in Anbar, deepening the U.S. role in efforts to halt the recent momentum of the extremists.
 16.2 
 Exercise Eager Lion 16 in Jordan during May.
 GCE training with 77th Jordanian Marine Battalion as part of Security Cooperation Team – Jordan during August.
 CLB-5 and MWSS-373 with the Lebanon Armed Forces during August.
 17.1
 GCE training with Royal Saudi Navy Forces.
 Supported combat operations in Mosul, Iraq alongside joint and Iraqi Security Forces securing and liberating the besieged city in dense, urban street fighting against ISIL, 
 Supported State Department and US Department of Defense initiatives in Syria fighting to disrupt ISIL and protect Internally Displaced Person (IDP) refugees around the Jordanian border.
 19.2
 GCE Marines reinforced the Embassy of the United States, Baghdad against an attack by Iran-backed militiamen.
 20.2
 GCE took part in Exercise Falcon Sentry in the UAE

Assets

The rotations are made up of four elements, Command Element (CE), Ground Combat Element (GCE), Logistics Combat Element (LCE) and the Aviation Combat Element (ACE)

2013–2018
 October 2013 – April 2014 (14.1)
 VMFA(AW)-225 "CE" – F/A-18D between October 2013 and April 2014.
 April 2014 – October 2014 (14.2)
 VMM-363 "YZ" – MV-22B Osprey
 VMAQ-4 "RM" – EA-6B Prowler
 VMA-211 "CF" – AV-8B Harrier
 Unknown unit – KC-130J Hercules
 Unknown unit – RQ-7 Shadow
 September 2014 – April 2015 (15.1)
 GCE – 2nd Battalion, 7th Marine Regiment
 April 2015 – October 2015 (15.2)
 GCE – 3rd Battalion, 7th Marine Regiment
 ACE
 VMM-165 "YW" – MV-22B Osprey
 October 2015 – April 2016. (16.1)
 GCE – 1st Battalion, 7th Marine Regiment
 LCE – Combat Logistics Battalion 1 (CLB-1)
 ACE
 VMM-268 "YQ" – MV-22B Osprey
 Detachment from Marine Aerial Refueler Transport Squadron 352
 April 2016 – October 2016 (16.2)
 CE – Headquarters Company, 5th Marine Regiment
 GCE – 2nd Battalion 7th Marines (2/7)
 LCE – Combat Logistics Battalion 5 (CLB-5)
 ACE
 VMFA(AW)-533 "ED" – F/A-18D from April 2016.
 VMM-363 "YZ" – MV-22B
 Marine Wing Support Squadron 373 (MWSS-373) during July 2016.
 Detachment from Marine Air Control Group 28 (MACG-28)
 Marine Aviation Logistics Squadron 16 (MALS-16)
 Detachment Alpha from Marine Aerial Refueler Transport Squadron 352 (VMGR-352) – KC-130J
 October 2016 – April 2017 (17.1)
 CE – Headquarters Company, 5th Marine Regiment
 GCE – 3rd Battalion 7th Marines
 LCE
 ACE – VMM-165
 April 2017 – October 2017 (17.2)
 CE
 GCE – 1st Battalion, 7th Marines
 LCE
 ACE
 VMA-231 – AV-8B
 VMM-364 – MV-22B
 Detachment from VMGR-352 – KC-130J
 Marine Wing Support Squadron 372 (MWSS-372)
 October 2017 – April 2018 (18.1)
 CE
 GCE – 2nd Battalion, 7th Marines
 LCE – Combat Logistics Detachment 5
 ACE
 VMM-363 – MV-22B
 Marine Wing Support Squadron 373 (MWSS-373)
 April 2018 – October 2018 (18.2)
 CE
 GCE – 3rd Battalion, 7th Marines
 LCE – Combat Logistics Detachment 37
 ACE
 VMM-164 "YT" – MV-22B
 Marine Wing Support Squadron 371 (MWSS-371)
 October 2018 – April 2019 (19.1)
 CE
 GCE – 3rd Battalion, 4th Marines
 LCE – Combat Logistics Detachment 34
 ACE - Marine Wing Support Squadron 372 (EFR TrapLordz)
 VMM-165 "EM" – MV-22B
 Detachment from VMGR-352 – KC-130J

2019–2026
 April 2019 – October 2019 (19.2)
 CE
 GCE – 1st Battalion, 7th Marines
 LCE – Combat Logistics Detachment 17
 ACE
 VMM-261 "EM" – MV-22B
 VMA-311 "WL" – AV-8
 October 2019 – April 2020 (20.1)
 CE
 GCE – 2nd Battalion, 7th Marines
 LCE – Combat Logistics Detachment 27
 ACE
VMM-364 "PF" – MV-22B
Marine Wing Support Detachment 373
 April 2020 – October 2020 (20.2)
 CE
 GCE – 2nd Battalion, 5th Marines
 LCE 
 ACE
 VMGR-252 (Det) "QB" - KC-130J
 VMM-263 (MV-22)
 MWSS-274
 MCAS-2
 MALS-26

See also

 Special Purpose Marine Air-Ground Task Force – Crisis Response – Africa
 Marine Air-Ground Task Force
 List of Marine Expeditionary Units
 Organization of the United States Marine Corps
 Immediate Response Force

References

Ad hoc units and formations of the United States Marine Corps
Military units and formations established in 2014
Military task forces